Ebbe Hamerik   (5 September 1898 – 12 August 1951) was a Danish composer. Born in Frederiksberg, he was the son of composer Asger Hamerik. He died at the age of 52 in Kattegat when his sailboat sank and he drowned.

Notable operas include Stepan (1922), Leonardo da Vinci: 4 Scener af hans Liv (1930), Marie Grubbe, inspired by the life of Marie Grubbe, (1940), Rejsekammeraten (eventyropera 1943) and Drømmerne (1949).

See also
List of Danish composers

Sources
Niels Schøirring: Musikkens historie i Danmark (1978)

1898 births
1951 deaths
Male composers
People from Frederiksberg
Deaths by drowning
Deaths due to shipwreck
20th-century Danish composers
20th-century Danish male musicians